Yu Ming-shi is a Taiwanese politician. He currently serves as the Administrative Deputy Minister of the Coast Guard Administration of the Executive Yuan.

CGA Deputy Ministry

Mainland China visit
Yu visited Mainland China in September 2010 with a delegation of government officials and business leaders. He met with Chen Yunlin, the President of the Association for Relations Across the Taiwan Straits.

See also
 Coast Guard Administration (Taiwan)
 Executive Yuan

References

Living people
Political office-holders in the Republic of China on Taiwan
Year of birth missing (living people)